Vigraharāja I (r. c. 734-759 CE ) was an Indian king from the Chahamana dynasty. He ruled parts of present-day Rajasthan in north-western India. He is also known as Vigrahanṛpa.

Vigraharaja succeeded his father Ajayaraja I as the Chahamana ruler. The Prithviraja Vijaya praises him using conventional eulogies, which indicates that he achieved military successes.

According to Prithviraja Vijaya, Vigraharaja had two sons: Chandraraja and Gopendraraja. He was succeeded by Chandraraja, who in turn was succeeded by Gopendraraja. The later Hammira Mahakavya mentions Chandraraja ("Shri Chandra") as the son of Vigraharaja's ancestor Naradeva.

References

Bibliography 

 
 

Chahamanas of Shakambhari